Lee Ji-ae (born May 13, 1981) is a South Korean former announcer and television personality. She graduated Sungshin women's university. She is a former cast member in the variety show Real Men.

Personal life
She married Kim Jeong Keun who is an announcer.

References

External links

 

1981 births
Living people
South Korean television personalities
South Korean announcers
Sungshin Women's University alumni